Xochitla (place of flowers) is an ecological park in Tepotzotlán, State of Mexico, Greater Mexico City that promotes environment care through various activities planned by the park. Xochitla wants to be a place where human beings can reunite with nature in a unique and fun way. In Xochitla, many research projects are conducted about the environment and human beings, with the purpose of understanding how to unite this two and creating recreational and educational activities. These activities take place in the main garden that is surrounded by trees and bushes. The park is designed for visitors of all ages and provides a space for leisure and exercising, along with dining options.

Goal
The main purpose of this 70-hectare park is to create activities in which human beings get integrated with nature and partners. They do this through environmental projects that involve education and sensibility. This park is one of the ways to spend the day learning more about nature before this was known to be a private tennis facility under the name of Tenistlan, thought the various gardens they have and learn how to take care of them also. They have many kinds of trees and flowers such as: cedar, thunder, populis, ash tree and eucalyptus, and hundreds of species of plants and flowers.

Activities
The visitors of this ecologic park are groups of schools, organizations, families and some businessmen. With the activities that Xochitla’s park has for them they integrate better as a group. While they play and realize the various activities they spend time together the vibe is different and more relaxed. They learn how to play the role of environmentalists and they learn how to take care of nature to have a better life quality. They have programs associated with the “SEP” (Secretaría de Educación Pública) that teaches a practice way to promote the comprehension and consciousness towards nature. Students are taught through various activities especially designed to be outdoors and for all kinds of public. In a few words, Xochitla is an open book to learn more about nature.

Xochitla offers different kinds of activities that can be made in the park. The most common are day excursions from different groups, mainly students. Camps, parties, weddings, birthdays, company events, among others can also be made in the main “Explanada”.

Services
It is considered a sanctuary because it is located in the middle of a polluted city where the green areas are poor and Xochitla is a pure green area and wants to teach people to take care of nature. This place counts with several gardens, a restaurant called “The Silo”, convention center, greenhouse and a snack bar called “El Tentempie”. They also count with a botanic garden, a compost area, plant wastewater treatment area and an area to grow vegetable.

Aquatic Plant Garden
In the year 2000 in “Fundación Xochitla” Lorena Martinez, Nayeli Gonzalez and Victor Herrera started a new project that consists in collecting aquatic plants and creating a new pond garden. This would take place in the Mexico City and show the different kinds of Mexican plants that are one of a kind. They want to create something different and traditional from the Mexican culture, but this time with plants. The main goal is to create an atmosphere of peace and to transport visitors to and “old” Mexico, learning more the ecologic, cultural and economic side of Mexico. This garden count with botanic plants.

References
  Xochitla Business information
  Xochitla Park details
  SEP official page

]

Parks in Mexico
Tourist attractions in Mexico City
Gardens in Mexico